The 2020 United States House of Representatives elections in California was held on November 3, 2020, to elect the 53 U.S. representatives from the state of California, one from each of the state's 53 congressional districts. The elections coincided with the 2020 U.S. presidential election, as well as other elections to the United States House of Representatives, elections to the United States Senate, and various state and local elections.

This is the first general election since 1994 where a Republican defeated an incumbent House Democrat in California. This year, despite the statewide dominance by Democratic presidential nominee Joe Biden, a record-breaking number of Republicans defeated Democratic House incumbents: Young Kim defeated Gil Cisneros in District 39, Michelle Park Steel defeated Harley Rouda in District 48, and David Valadao defeated TJ Cox in District 21 to reclaim his old seat. This happened even as Democrats won the statewide combined House vote by a wider margin than Biden. Mike Garcia also defeated Christy Smith in District 25 to retain the seat he flipped in the May 12 special election to fill the seat vacated by Katie Hill.

Overview

District 1

The 1st district covers the northeastern part of the state bordering Nevada and Oregon. The incumbent is Republican Doug LaMalfa, who was re-elected with 54.9% of the vote in 2018.

Candidates

Advanced to general
 Audrey Denney (Democratic), educator and 2018 nominee for California's 1st congressional district
 Doug LaMalfa (Republican), incumbent U.S. Representative

Eliminated in primary
 Gregory Edward Cheadle (no party preference), perennial candidate
 Joseph LeTourneau IV (no party preference), leadership developer
 Rob Lydon (Democratic), veterinarian

Endorsements

Predictions

Polling

Results

District 2

The 2nd district encompasses the North Coast, stretching from the Golden Gate Bridge to the Oregon border, taking in San Rafael, Petaluma, Novato, Windsor, Healdsburg, Ukiah, Fort Bragg, Fortuna, Eureka, Arcata, McKinleyville, and Crescent City. The incumbent is Democrat Jared Huffman, who was re-elected with 77.0% of the vote in 2018.

Candidates

Advanced to general
 Jared Huffman (Democratic), incumbent U.S. Representative
 Dale K. Mensing (Republican), candidate for California's 2nd congressional district in 2014, 2016, and 2018

Eliminated in primary
 Melissa Bradley (Green), businesswoman
 Charles "Wally" Coppock (American Independent)
 Rachel Moniz (Democratic), operations officer

Predictions

Results

District 3

The 3rd district takes in areas north and west of Sacramento. It consists of Colusa, Sutter, and Yuba counties plus portions of Glenn, Lake, Sacramento, Solano, and Yolo counties. The incumbent is Democrat John Garamendi, who was re-elected with 58.1% of the vote in 2018.

Candidates

Advanced to general
John Garamendi (Democratic), incumbent U.S. Representative
Tamika Hamilton (Republican), U.S. Air Force veteran

Eliminated in primary
Sean Feucht (Republican), gospel singer

Endorsements

Predictions

Results

District 4

The 4th district encompasses the suburbs of Sacramento and the Sierra Nevada. The incumbent is Republican Tom McClintock, who was re-elected with 54.1% of the vote in 2018.

Candidates

Advanced to general
Brynne S. Kennedy (Democratic), businesswoman
Tom McClintock (Republican), incumbent U.S. Representative

Eliminated in primary
 Julianne Benzel (Republican), history teacher
 Jamie Byers (Republican), state parole agent
 Robert Lawton (no party preference), businessman and Democratic candidate for California's 4th congressional district in 2018
Jacob Thomas (Republican), businessman

Withdrawn
 Sean Frame (Democratic), Placerville Union school board member

Declined
 Jessica Morse (Democratic), deputy secretary of forest resources management at the California Natural Resources Agency and candidate for California's 4th congressional district in 2018

Endorsements

Predictions

Polling

with Generic Opponent

Results

District 5

The 5th district encompasses much of California's wine country. It includes Cotati, Rohnert Park, Santa Rosa, Sonoma, Napa, American Canyon, Vallejo, Benicia, Hercules, and part of Martinez. The incumbent is Democrat Mike Thompson, who was re-elected with 78.9% of the vote in 2018.

Candidates

Advanced to general
 Scott Giblin (Republican), information services technician
 Mike Thompson (Democratic), incumbent U.S. Representative

Eliminated in primary
 Jason Kishineff (Democratic), activist
 Josh Wesley Tyler (Democratic), teacher

Endorsements

Predictions

Results

District 6
The 6th district takes in Sacramento and its surrounding suburbs, including West Sacramento and North Highlands. The incumbent is Democrat Doris Matsui, who was re-elected with 80.4% of the vote in 2018.

Candidates

Advanced to general
Chris Bish (Republican), realtor
Doris Matsui (Democratic), incumbent U.S. Representative

Eliminated in primary
 Sherwood Ellsworth Haisty Jr. (Republican), minister
 Benjamin Emard (Democratic), attorney

Endorsements

Predictions

Results

District 7

The 7th district is located in southern and eastern Sacramento County, including the cities of Elk Grove, Folsom, and Rancho Cordova. The incumbent is Democrat Ami Bera, who was re-elected with 55.0% of the vote in 2018.

Candidates

Advanced to general
 Ami Bera (Democratic), incumbent U.S. Representative
 Buzz Patterson (Republican), retired United States Air Force Lieutenant Colonel

Eliminated in primary
 Jeff Burdick (Democratic), public affairs specialist
 Jon Ivy (Republican), voting rights activist
 Chris Richardson (Green), engineer

Endorsements

Predictions

Results

District 8

The 8th district includes most of the eastern desert regions of the state. It stretches from Mono Lake to Twentynine Palms and consists of Inyo and Mono counties plus most of San Bernardino County. The incumbent is Republican Paul Cook, who was re-elected with 60.0% of the vote in 2018. Cook announced on September 17, 2019, that he would not seek re-election, instead planning to run for an open seat on the San Bernardino County Board of Supervisors.

Candidates

Advanced to general
 Christine Bubser (Democratic), engineer and biotechnology advisor
 Jay Obernolte (Republican), state assemblyman

Eliminated in primary
 Bob Conaway (Democratic), attorney and candidate for California's 8th congressional district in 2014
 Tim Donnelly (Republican), former state assemblyman and candidate for California's 8th congressional district in 2016 & 2018
 James Ellars (Democratic), energy consultant
 Jeff Esmus (no party preference), teacher
 Jerry Laws (Republican), candidate for U.S. Senate in 2016 and 2018
 Jeremy Staat (Republican), U.S. Marine veteran and former NFL player
 Justin David Whitehead (Republican), realtor

Declined
 Paul Cook (Republican), incumbent U.S. Representative
 Chad Mayes (Independent), state assemblyman

Endorsements

Predictions

Polling

General election

Results

District 9

The 9th district is centered around the San Joaquin Delta, taking in Stockton, Antioch, Galt, Oakley, Lathrop, and Lodi. The incumbent is Democrat Jerry McNerney, who was re-elected with 56.5% of the vote in 2018.

Candidates

Advanced to general
 Antonio C. "Tony" Amador (Republican), retired U.S. Marshal and candidate for California's 9th congressional district in 2014 and 2016
 Jerry McNerney (Democratic), incumbent U.S. Representative

Eliminated in primary
 William Martinek (Republican), financial advisor

Predictions

Results

District 10

The 10th district covers San Joaquin Valley, including the cities of Oakdale, Manteca, Modesto, Tracy, and Turlock. The incumbent is Democrat Josh Harder, who flipped the district and was elected with 52.3% of the vote in the 2018 district election.

Candidates

Advanced to general
Josh Harder (Democratic), incumbent U.S. Representative
Ted Howze (Republican), veterinarian, former Turlock city councilman, and candidate for California's 10th congressional district in 2018

Eliminated in primary
 Michael J. "Mike" Barkley (Democratic), accountant and perennial candidate
 Ryan Blevins (Democratic), robotics engineer
 Bob Elliott (Republican), San Joaquin County supervisor
 Marla Sousa Livengood (Republican), businesswoman and candidate for California's 9th congressional district in 2018

Withdrawn
 Charles Dossett (Republican), U.S. Army veteran

Declined
 Jeff Denham (Republican), former U.S. Representative

Endorsements

Predictions

Results

District 11

The 11th district encompasses parts of the East Bay, including Alamo, Antioch, Bay Point, Blackhawk, Clayton, Concord, Danville, Diablo, El Cerrito, El Sobrante, Kensington, Lafayette, Moraga, Orinda, Pittsburg, Pleasant Hill, San Pablo, Richmond and Walnut Creek. The incumbent is Democrat Mark DeSaulnier, who was re-elected with 74.1% of the vote in 2018.

Candidates

Advanced to general
Mark DeSaulnier (Democratic), incumbent U.S. Representative
Nisha Sharma (Republican), realtor

Eliminated in primary
 Michael Ernest Kerr (Green), social justice advocate

Predictions

Results

District 12

The 12th district is based entirely within San Francisco. The incumbent is the Speaker of the House Nancy Pelosi (Democratic), who was re-elected with 86.8% of the vote in 2018.

Candidates

Advanced to general
Shahid Buttar (Democratic), attorney and democratic socialist activist
Nancy Pelosi (Democratic), incumbent U.S. Representative

Eliminated in primary
 Agatha Bacelar (Democratic), documentary filmmaker and engineer
 John Dennis (Republican), businessman and perennial candidate
 Deanna Lorraine (Republican), political commentator

Withdrawn
 Tom Gallagher (Democratic), former Massachusetts state representative (1980–1986)

Endorsements

Predictions

Results

District 13

The 13th district takes in northern Alameda County, encompassing Alameda, Albany, Berkeley, Emeryville, Oakland, Piedmont, and San Leandro. The incumbent is Democrat Barbara Lee, who was re-elected with 88.4% of the vote in 2018.

Candidates

Advanced to general
 Barbara Lee (Democratic), incumbent U.S Representative
 Nikka Piterman (Republican), software engineer

Predictions

Results

District 14

The 14th district is located on the San Francisco Peninsula, taking in most of San Mateo County and a small part of southwestern San Francisco. The incumbent is Democrat Jackie Speier, who was re-elected with 79.2% of the vote in 2018.

Candidates

Advanced to general
 Ran Petel (Republican), financial executive
 Jackie Speier (Democratic), incumbent U.S Representative

Eliminated in primary
 Cristos Goodrow (Democratic), technology executive
 Eric Taylor (no party preference), research manager

Predictions

Results

District 15

The 15th district encompasses eastern Alameda County, including Castro Valley, Dublin, Fremont, Hayward, Livermore, Pleasanton, Sunol, Union City, and parts of Contra Costa County, including San Ramon and part of Danville. The incumbent is Democrat Eric Swalwell, who was re-elected with 73.0% of the vote in 2018, and ran in the 2020 presidential race. Swalwell joined the House race after ending his presidential campaign.

Candidates

Advanced to general
 Alison Hayden (Republican), special education teacher
 Eric Swalwell (Democratic), incumbent U.S. Representative

Eliminated in primary
 Samantha Campbell (Democratic), college student
 Don J. Grundmann (no party preference), chiropractor (Constitution)
 Austin E. Intal (Democratic), sales and real estate agent
 Peter Yuan Liu (Republican), candidate for Governor of California in 2018
 Tuan Phan (Democratic), biochemist

Withdrawn
 Aisha Wahab (Democratic), Hayward city councilwoman
 Bob Wieckowski (Democratic), state senator

Declined
 Catharine Baker (Republican), former state assemblywoman
 Rob Bonta (Democratic), state assemblyman ‘’(running for re-election)’’
 Ellen Corbett (Democratic), former majority leader of the California State Senate
 Scott Haggerty (Democratic), Alameda County supervisor
 Nancy O'Malley (Democratic), Alameda County district attorney
 Bill Quirk (Democratic), state assemblyman
 Tim Sbranti (Democratic), former mayor of Dublin

Predictions

Results

District 16

The 16th district is located in central San Joaquin Valley, including the cities of Madera, Merced, and the western half of Fresno. The incumbent is Democrat Jim Costa, who was re-elected with 57.5% of the vote in 2018.

Candidates

Advanced to general
 Kevin Cookingham (Republican), former Clovis Unified School District educator
 Jim Costa (Democratic), incumbent U.S. Representative

Eliminated in primary
 Esmeralda Soria (Democratic), Fresno City Councilwoman
 Kimberly Elizabeth Williams (Democratic), former U.S. diplomat and college professor

Endorsements

Predictions

Results

District 17

The 17th district encompasses parts of the Silicon Valley, taking in Sunnyvale, Cupertino, Santa Clara, Milpitas, Newark, most of Fremont, and a small part of northern San Jose. The incumbent is Democrat Ro Khanna, who was re-elected with 75.3% of the vote in 2018.

Candidates

Advanced to general
 Ro Khanna (Democratic), incumbent U.S. Representative
 Ritesh Tandon (Republican), businessman

Eliminated in primary
 Joe Dehn (Libertarian), square dance caller
 Stephen Forbes (Democratic), business analyst and candidate for California's 17th congressional district in 2018

Endorsements

Predictions

Results

District 18

The 18th district encompasses the western San Francisco South Bay and includes the cities of Palo Alto, Redwood City, Menlo Park, Stanford, Los Altos, Mountain View, Campbell, Saratoga, and Los Gatos, as well as part of San Jose. The incumbent is Democrat Anna Eshoo, who was re-elected with 74.5% of the vote in 2018.

Candidates

Advanced to general
 Anna Eshoo (Democratic), incumbent U.S. Representative
 Rishi Kumar (Democratic), Saratoga city councilman

Eliminated in primary
 Richard B. Fox (Republican), physician
 Bob Goodwyn (Libertarian), pilot
 Phil Reynolds (Republican), engineer

Predictions

Results

District 19

The 19th district is based in the eastern San Francisco South Bay centering on San Jose, as well as taking in Morgan Hill. The incumbent is Democrat Zoe Lofgren, who was re-elected with 73.8% of the vote in 2018.

Candidates

Advanced to general
 Justin Aguilera (Republican), businessman
 Zoe Lofgren (Democratic), incumbent U.S. Representative

Eliminated in primary
 Ignacio Cruz (Republican), economic development director
 Jason Mallory (no party preference)
 Ivan Torres (Democratic), healthcare worker

Predictions

Results

District 20

The 20th district encompasses the Monterey Bay, including Santa Cruz, Salinas, and Gilroy. The incumbent is Democrat Jimmy Panetta, who was re-elected with 81.4% of the vote in 2018.

Candidates

Advanced to general
 Jeff Gorman (Republican), financial adviser
 Jimmy Panetta (Democratic), incumbent U.S. Representative

Eliminated in primary
 Adam Bolaños Scow (Democratic), environmental activist

Predictions

Results

District 21

The 21st district covers San Joaquin Valley, including Coalinga, Delano, Hanford, and parts of Bakersfield, specifically East Bakersfield and Downtown Bakersfield. The incumbent is Democrat TJ Cox, who flipped the district and was elected in 2018 with 50.4% of the vote.

Candidates

Advanced to general
 TJ Cox (Democratic), incumbent U.S. Representative
 David Valadao (Republican), former U.S. Representative

Eliminated in primary
 Ricardo De La Fuente (Democratic), businessman and son of Rocky De La Fuente
 Rocky De La Fuente (Republican), candidate for U.S. president in 2016 and 2020 and perennial candidate

Declined
 Ruben Macareno (no party preference), Farmersville city councilman and former chair of the Tulare County Democratic Party

Endorsements

Predictions

Polling

General election

Results

District 22

The 22nd district covers San Joaquin Valley, including eastern Fresno, Clovis, Tulare, and Visalia. The incumbent is Republican Devin Nunes, who was re-elected with 52.7% of the vote in 2018.

Candidates

Advanced to general
Phil Arballo (Democratic), financial adviser
 Devin Nunes (Republican), incumbent U.S. Representative

Eliminated in primary
 Bobby Bliatout (Democratic), healthcare executive and candidate for California's 22nd congressional district in 2018
 Eric Garcia (no party preference), graduate student
 Dary Rezvani (Democratic), management consultant

Declined
 Ricardo Franco (Democratic), candidate for California's 22nd congressional district in 2018
 Andrew Janz (Democratic), Fresno County prosecutor and nominee for California's 22nd congressional district in 2018 (running for mayor of Fresno)

Endorsements

Predictions

Polling

General election

Results

District 23

The 23rd district is based in the southern Central Valley, taking in parts of Bakersfield, Porterville, California City, Ridgecrest, western Lancaster, Rosamond, and Quartz Hill. The incumbent is House Minority Leader, Republican Kevin McCarthy, who was re-elected with 63.7% of the vote in 2018.

Candidates

Advanced to general
 Kim Mangone (Democratic), systems engineer and U.S. Air Force veteran
 Kevin McCarthy (Republican), incumbent U.S. Representative

Predictions

Results

District 24

The 24th district is based in the Central Coast and includes San Luis Obispo and Santa Barbara counties. The incumbent is Democrat Salud Carbajal, who was re-elected with 58.6% of the vote in 2018.

Candidates

Advanced to general
 Andy Caldwell (Republican), nonprofit executive
 Salud Carbajal (Democratic), incumbent U.S. Representative

Eliminated in primary
 Kenneth Young (no party preference), civil engineer

Endorsements

Predictions

Results

District 25

The 25th district is based in northern Los Angeles County and eastern Ventura County, and includes the cities of Santa Clarita, Simi Valley, Palmdale, and eastern Lancaster. The seat was vacant from November 3, 2019, to May 19, 2020. Democrat Katie Hill resigned after she was alleged to have had inappropriate relations with one of her congressional staffers. Hill had flipped the district in 2018 and was elected with 54.4% of the vote. A special election to fill Hill's vacancy was held before the general election in 2020. Republican Mike Garcia won the special election with 54.9% of the vote, and was seated on May 19, 2020.

Candidates

Advanced to general
 Mike Garcia (Republican), incumbent U.S. Representative
 Christy Smith (Democratic), state assemblywoman

Eliminated in primary
 Otis Lee Cooper (no party preference), legal defense investigator
 Robert Cooper III (Democratic), college professor
 Getro Franck Elize (Democratic), patient resource worker
 Kenneth Jenks (Republican), U.S. Marine Corps veteran and telecommunications executive
 Steve Knight (Republican), former U.S. Representative
 David Lozano (Republican), attorney
 Daniel Mercuri (Republican), businessman
 George Papadopoulos (Republican), foreign policy adviser for Donald Trump's 2016 presidential campaign
 Cenk Uygur (Democratic), journalist and CEO and host of The Young Turks
 Aníbal Valdéz-Ortega (Democratic), attorney and community organizer

Withdrawn
 Mark Cripe (Republican), Los Angeles County deputy sheriff
 Christopher C. Smith (Democratic), documentary filmmaker
 Angela Underwood-Jacobs (Republican), Lancaster city councilwoman
 Suzette Valladares (Republican), businesswoman

Endorsements

Predictions

Polling

Primary election

General election

Generic Republican v.s. Generic Democrat

Results

District 26

The 26th district is based in the southern Central Coast and is located entirely within Ventura County, taking in Camarillo, Oxnard, Ventura, Santa Paula, Thousand Oaks, Westlake Village, Moorpark, and parts of Simi Valley. The incumbent is Democrat Julia Brownley, who was re-elected with 61.9% of the vote in 2018.

Candidates

Advanced to general
 Ronda Baldwin-Kennedy (Republican), attorney and candidate for California State Assembly in 2018
 Julia Brownley (Democratic), incumbent U.S. Representative

Eliminated in primary
 Enrique Petris (Democratic), contract administrator
 Robert L. Salas (Democratic), retired teacher

Endorsements

Predictions

Results

District 27

The 27 district encompasses the San Gabriel Valley, including Alhambra, Altadena, Arcadia, Bradbury, Claremont, East Pasadena, Glendora, Monrovia, Monterey Park, Pasadena, Rosemead, San Antonio Heights, San Gabriel, San Marino, Sierra Madre, South Pasadena, South San Gabriel, Temple City, and Upland. The incumbent is Democrat Judy Chu, who was re-elected with 79.2% of the vote in 2018.

Candidates

Advanced to general
 Judy Chu (Democratic), incumbent U.S. Representative
 Johnny J. Nalbandian (Republican), entrepreneur and candidate for California's 28th congressional district in 2018

Eliminated in primary
 Beatrice Cardenas (Republican), loan officer
 Christian Daly (no party preference), former Duarte city manager intern

Predictions

Results

District 28

The 28th district is based in the San Fernando Valley and includes West Hollywood, Burbank, parts of Pasadena, Glendale, the Verdugo Hills communities of Sunland and Tujunga, as well as parts of central Los Angeles including Hollywood, the Hollywood Hills, Echo Park, Silver Lake, and Los Feliz. The incumbent is Democrat Adam Schiff, who was re-elected with 78.4% of the vote in 2018.

Candidates

Advanced to general
 Eric Early (Republican), attorney and candidate for Attorney General of California in 2018
 Adam Schiff (Democratic), incumbent U.S. Representative

Eliminated in primary
 Chad D. Anderson (Democratic), entrepreneur
 Jennifer Barbosa (no party preference), realtor and activist
 William Bodell (Republican), businessman
 Sal Genovese (Democratic), community services director
 Maebe A. Girl (Democratic), Silver Lake neighborhood councilwoman and drag queen
 Ara Khachig Manoogian (Democratic), security systems integrator

Endorsements

Predictions

Results

District 29

The 29th district is based in the eastern San Fernando Valley, taking in the city of San Fernando as well as the Los Angeles communities of Van Nuys, Pacoima, Arleta, Panorama City, Sylmar and parts of Sun Valley and North Hollywood. The incumbent is Democrat Tony Cárdenas, who was re-elected with 80.6% of the vote in 2018.

Candidates

Advanced to general
 Tony Cárdenas (Democratic), incumbent U.S. Representative
  Angélica Dueñas (Democratic), member of the Sun Valley Neighborhood council

Eliminated in primary
 Michael R. Guzik (Democratic), ride-share driver
 Brian Perras (Republican), U.S. Navy veteran

Endorsements

Predictions

Results

District 30

The 30th district is based in the western San Fernando Valley, including the Los Angeles neighborhoods of Canoga Park, Chatsworth, Encino, Granada Hills, Northridge, Porter Ranch, Reseda, Sherman Oaks, Studio City, Tarzana, Toluca Lake, West Hills, Winnetka, and Woodland Hills, as well as Calabasas, Bell Canyon, and Hidden Hills. The incumbent is Democrat Brad Sherman, who was re-elected with 73.4% of the vote in 2018.

Candidates

Advanced to general
 Mark S. Reed (Republican), businessman and perennial candidate
 Brad Sherman (Democratic), incumbent U.S. Representative

Eliminated in primary
 Courtney "CJ" Berina (Democratic), marketing consultant
 Brian T. Carroll (Democratic)
 Raji Rab (Democratic), commercial pilot and candidate for California's 30th congressional district in 2018

Predictions

Results

District 31

The 31st district encompasses parts of the Inland Empire, including San Bernardino, Rancho Cucamonga, Redlands, and parts of Rialto. The incumbent is Democrat Pete Aguilar, who was re-elected with 58.7% of the vote in 2018.

Candidates

Advanced to general
 Pete Aguilar (Democratic), incumbent U.S. Representative
 Agnes Gibboney (Republican), activist and angel mom

Predictions

Results

District 32

The 32nd district takes in the eastern San Gabriel Valley, including Baldwin Park, El Monte, West Covina, San Dimas, Azusa, and southern Glendora. The incumbent is Democrat Grace Napolitano, who was re-elected with 68.8% of the vote in 2018.

Candidates

Advanced to general
 Grace Napolitano (Democratic), incumbent U.S. Representative
 Joshua M. Scott (Republican), political strategist and candidate for California's 32nd congressional district in 2018

Eliminated in primary
 Emanuel Gonzales (Democratic), dialysis technician
 Meshal "Kash" Kashifalghita (Democratic), U.S. Army Reserve officer
 Raul Ali Madrigal (Democratic, write-in), USMC veteran

Predictions

Results

District 33

The 33rd district spans the coastal region of Los Angeles County, including the Beach Cities, Westside Los Angeles, and the Palos Verdes Peninsula. The incumbent is Democrat Ted Lieu, who was re-elected with 70.0% of the vote in 2018.

Candidates

Advanced to general
 James P. Bradley (Republican), businessman and candidate for U.S. Senate in 2018
 Ted Lieu (Democratic), incumbent U.S. Representative

Eliminated in primary
 Liz Barris (Democratic), nonprofit director
 Albert Maxwell Goldberg (Democratic), candidate for California's 26th congressional district in 2012
 Sarah Sun Liew (Republican), businesswoman
 Kenneth W. Wright (no party preference), ophthalmology surgeon

Endorsements

Predictions

Results

District 34

The 34th district is located entirely in the city of Los Angeles and includes the Central, East, and Northeast neighborhoods, such as Chinatown, Downtown, Eagle Rock, and Koreatown. The incumbent is Democrat Jimmy Gomez, who was re-elected with 72.5% of the vote in 2018.

Candidates

Advanced to general
 Jimmy Gomez (Democratic), incumbent U.S. Representative
 David Kim (Democratic), MacArthur Park neighborhood council board-member

Eliminated in primary
 Frances Yasmeen Motiwalla (Democratic), activist (endorsed Kim) 
 Keanakay Scott (Democratic), author
 Joanne L. Wright (Republican)

Endorsements

Predictions

Results

District 35

The 35th district takes in southwestern San Bernardino County, including Chino, Fontana, Montclair, Ontario, as well as Pomona. The incumbent is Democrat Norma Torres, who was re-elected with 69.4% of the vote in 2018.

Candidates

Advanced to general
 Mike Cargile (Republican), independent filmmaker
 Norma Torres (Democratic), incumbent U.S. Representative

Predictions

Results

District 36

The 36th district encompasses eastern Riverside County, including the desert communities of Palm Springs, Palm Desert, Indio, Coachella, Rancho Mirage, Desert Hot Springs, Indian Wells, and Cathedral City, as well as Calimesa, Banning, Beaumont, San Jacinto, and Hemet. The incumbent is Democrat Raul Ruiz, who was re-elected with 59.0% of the vote in 2018.

Candidates

Advanced to general
 Erin Cruz (Republican), author and candidate for U.S. Senate in 2018
 Raul Ruiz (Democratic), incumbent U.S. Representative

Eliminated in primary
 Patrice Kimbler (Republican)
 Milo Stevanovich (Republican), attorney

Withdrawn
Raul Ruiz (Republican)

Predictions

Results

District 37

The 37th district encompasses west and southwest Los Angeles, as well as Culver City and Inglewood. The incumbent is Democrat Karen Bass, who was re-elected with 89.1% of the vote in 2018.

Candidates

Advanced to general
 Karen Bass (Democratic), incumbent U.S. Representative
 Errol Webber (Republican), documentary film producer

Eliminated in primary
 Larry Thompson (no party preference), attorney

Predictions

Results

District 38

The 38th district takes encompasses southeastern Los Angeles County, as well as a small sliver of Orange County, taking in La Palma. The incumbent is Democrat Linda Sánchez, who was re-elected with 68.9% of the vote in 2018.

Candidates

Advanced to general
 Linda Sánchez (Democratic), incumbent U.S. Representative
 Michael Tolar (Democratic), retail store worker

Predictions

Results

District 39

The 39th district encompasses parts of the San Gabriel Valley, taking in La Habra Heights, Diamond Bar, Walnut, Hacienda Heights and Rowland Heights, as well as northern Orange County, including Fullerton, La Habra, Brea, Buena Park, Placentia, and Yorba Linda (the hometown of Republican President Richard Nixon). The district also takes in a small portion of southwestern San Bernardino County, covering Chino Hills. The incumbent Representative, Democrat Gil Cisneros, who flipped the district and was elected in 2018, lost reelection to Republican candidate Young Kim. Kim became one of the first three Korean-American women elected to Congress.

Candidates

Advanced to general
 Gil Cisneros (Democratic), incumbent U.S. Representative
 Young Kim (Republican), former state assemblywoman and candidate for California's 39th congressional district in 2018

Eliminated in primary
 Steve Cox (no party preference), motorcycle journalist and candidate for California's 39th congressional district in 2018

Endorsements

Predictions

Polling

General election

with generic Republican

Results

District 40

The 40th district is centered around East Los Angeles and also includes Downey, Bellflower, and Commerce. The incumbent is Democrat Lucille Roybal-Allard, who was re-elected with 77.3% of the vote in 2018.

Candidates

Advanced to general
 C. Antonio Delgado (Republican), immigration attorney
 Lucille Roybal-Allard (Democratic), incumbent U.S. Representative

Eliminated in primary
 Rodolfo Cortes Barragan (Green), scientist and candidate for California's 40th congressional district in 2018
 Anthony Felix Jr. (Democratic), homeless services analyst
 Michael Donnell Graham Jr. (American Independent)
 David John Sanchez (Democratic), teacher, activist, and founding member of the Brown Berets

Predictions

Results

District 41

The 41st district is located in the Inland Empire and takes in western Riverside County, including Jurupa Valley, Moreno Valley, Perris, and Riverside. The incumbent is Democrat Mark Takano, who was re-elected with 65.1% of the vote in 2018.

Candidates

Advanced to general
 Aja Smith (Republican), U.S. Air Force veteran and candidate for California's 41st congressional district in 2018
 Mark Takano (Democratic), incumbent U.S. Representative

Eliminated in primary
 Grace Williams (Democratic), former Perris city official

Endorsements

Predictions

Results

District 42

The 42nd district is encompasses western and southwestern Riverside County, and includes Eastvale, Norco, Corona, Temescal Valley, Lake Elsinore, Canyon Lake, Wildomar, north Temecula, Murrieta and Menifee. The incumbent is Republican Ken Calvert, who was re-elected with 56.5% of the vote in 2018.

Candidates

Advanced to general
 Ken Calvert (Republican), incumbent U.S. Representative
 William "Liam" O'Mara (Democratic), historian and college professor

Eliminated in primary
 Regina Marston (Democratic), businesswoman

Withdrew
 Julia Peacock (Democratic), public high school teacher and candidate for California's 42nd congressional district in 2018

Predictions

Results

District 43

The 43rd district is based in southern Los Angeles County and includes portions of Los Angeles and Torrance, as well as all of Hawthorne, Lawndale, Gardena, Inglewood and Lomita. The incumbent is Democrat Maxine Waters, who was re-elected with 77.7% of the vote in 2018.

Candidates

Advanced to general
 Joe Collins III (Republican), U.S. Navy veteran
 Maxine Waters (Democratic), incumbent U.S. Representative

Eliminated in primary
 Omar Navarro (Republican), businessman and candidate for California's 43rd congressional district in 2016 and 2018

Endorsements

Predictions

Results

District 44

The 44th district is based in southern Los Angeles County and includes Carson, Compton, Lynwood, North Long Beach, and San Pedro. The incumbent is Democrat Nanette Barragán, who was re-elected with 68.3% of the vote in 2018.

Candidates

Advanced to general
 Nanette Barragán (Democratic), incumbent U.S. Representative
 Analilia Joya (Democratic), teacher and disability advocate

Eliminated in primary
 Billy Z. Earley (Republican), healthcare advocate
 Morris F. Griffin (Democratic), maintenance technician

Predictions

Results

District 45

The 45th district is based in central Orange County, encompassing Irvine, Tustin, North Tustin, Villa Park, Anaheim Hills, eastern Orange, Laguna Hills, Laguna Woods, Lake Forest, Rancho Santa Margarita, Coto de Caza and Mission Viejo. The incumbent is Democrat Katie Porter, who flipped the district and was elected with 52.1% of the vote in 2018.

Candidates

Advanced to general
 Katie Porter (Democratic), incumbent U.S. Representative
 Greg Raths (Republican), retired United States Marine Corps Colonel, former mayor of Mission Viejo and candidate for California's 45th congressional district in 2014 and 2016

Eliminated in primary
 Rhonda Furin (Republican), special education teacher
 Christopher J. Gonzales (Republican), attorney and U.S. Army veteran
 Peggy Huang (Republican), Yorba Linda city councilwoman and former mayor of Yorba Linda
 Don Sedgwick (Republican), mayor of Laguna Hills
 Lisa Sparks (Republican), Orange County Department of Education trustee and Chapman University professor

Withdrew
 Ray Gennawey (Republican), Orange County prosecutor
 Brenton Woolworth (Republican), businessman

Declined
 Mimi Walters (Republican), former U.S. Representative

Endorsements

Predictions

Polling

Primary election

Results

District 46

The 46th district is based in north-central Orange County, taking in Anaheim, Santa Ana, western Orange, and eastern Garden Grove. The incumbent is Democrat Lou Correa, who was reelected with 69.1% of the vote in 2018.

Candidates

Advanced to general
 Lou Correa (Democratic), incumbent U.S. Representative
 James S. Waters (Republican), retired postman

Eliminated in primary
 Will Johnson (no party preference), caregiver
 Pablo Mendiolea (Democratic), businessman
 Ed Rushman (no party preference), IT project manager and candidate for California's 46th congressional district in 2018 (American Solidarity)

Predictions

Results

District 47

The 47th district is centered in Long Beach and extends into northwestern Orange County, taking in parts of Garden Grove and Westminster, and taking all of Stanton, Los Alamitos, and Cypress. The incumbent is Democrat Alan Lowenthal, who was reelected with 64.9% of the vote in 2018.

Candidates

Advanced to general
 John Briscoe (Republican), Ocean View School District trustee and candidate for California's 47th congressional district in 2018
 Alan Lowenthal (Democratic), incumbent U.S. Representative

Eliminated in primary
 Peter Mathews (Democratic), Cypress College political science professor
 Jalen Dupree McLeod (Democratic), teaching assistant
 Sou Moua (Republican), planning commissioner
 Amy Phan West (Republican), candidate for Westminster city council in 2018 and former member of Orange County Parks Commission

Endorsements

Predictions

Results

District 48

The 48th district encompasses coastal Orange County, taking in Seal Beach, Sunset Beach, Huntington Beach, Midway City, Fountain Valley, Costa Mesa, Newport Beach, Laguna Beach, Aliso Viejo, and Laguna Niguel, as well as parts of Westminster and Garden Grove. The incumbent is Democrat Harley Rouda, who flipped the district and was elected with 53.6% of the vote in 2018.

Candidates

Advanced to general
 Harley Rouda (Democratic), incumbent U.S. Representative
 Michelle Steel (Republican), Orange County Chair supervisor

Eliminated in primary
 Brian Burley (Republican), information technology entrepreneur
 Christopher Engels (Republican), businessman
 James Brian Griffin (Republican), real estate broker
 Richard Mata (American Independent), retired teacher
 John Thomas Schuesler (Republican), mortgage consultant

Withdrew
 James Bradley (Republican), businessman and candidate for U.S. Senate in 2018 (running for California's 33rd congressional district)

Declined
 Scott Baugh (Republican), former chair of the Orange County Republican Party and candidate for California's 48th congressional district in 2018
 Janet Nguyen (Republican), former state senator

Endorsements

Predictions

Polling

Primary election

General election

with Brian Burley

with Generic Opponent

Results

District 49

The 49th district encompasses the northern coastal areas of San Diego County, including the cities of Oceanside, Vista, Carlsbad, and Encinitas, as well as a small part of southern Orange County, taking in Dana Point, Ladera Ranch, San Clemente, and San Juan Capistrano. The incumbent is Democrat Mike Levin, who flipped the district and was elected with 56.4% of the vote in 2018.

Candidates

Advanced to general
 Mike Levin (Democratic), incumbent U.S. Representative
 Brian Maryott (Republican), San Juan Capistrano councilman, former mayor of San Juan Capistrano, and candidate for California's 49th congressional district in 2018

Declined
 Kristin Gaspar (Republican), San Diego County supervisor, former mayor of Encinitas, and candidate for California's 49th congressional district in 2018

Predictions

Polling

General election

Results

District 50

The 50th district covers inland San Diego County consisting of suburban and outlying areas of the county, including Fallbrook, San Marcos, Valley Center, Ramona, Escondido, Santee, Lakeside, parts of El Cajon and a slice of southwestern Riverside County, taking in parts of Temecula. The incumbent was Republican Duncan D. Hunter, who was re-elected with 51.7% of the vote in 2018. On December 3, 2019, Hunter pleaded to guilty to campaign finance violations and resigned from office effective January 13, 2020.

Candidates

Advanced to general
 Ammar Campa-Najjar (Democratic), former Department of Labor official and candidate for California's 50th congressional district in 2018
 Darrell Issa (Republican), former U.S. Representative for California's 49th congressional district

Eliminated in primary
 José Cortés (Peace and Freedom), community organizer
 Carl DeMaio (Republican), former San Diego city councilman and candidate for California's 52nd congressional district in 2014
 Helen L. Horvath (no party preference), psychologist
 Lucinda KWH Jahn (no party preference), entertainment industry professional
 Brian W. Jones (Republican), state senator
 Henry Alan Ota (no party preference), farmer
 Nathan "Nate" Wilkins (Republican), retired U.S. Navy SEAL

Withdrew
 Sam Abed (Republican), former mayor of Escondido
 Alex Balkin (Democratic), former U.S. Navy Inspector General
 Marisa Calderon (Democratic), executive director of the National Association of Hispanic Real Estate Professionals
 Duncan D. Hunter (Republican), former U.S. Representative
 Bill Wells (Republican), mayor of El Cajon and candidate for California's 50th congressional district in 2018
 Larry Wilske (Republican), retired Navy SEAL

Declined
 Joel Anderson (Republican), former state senator
 Matt Rahn (Republican), Temecula city councilman and former mayor of Temecula

Endorsements

Predictions

Polling

Primary election

with Duncan Hunter

General election

with DeMaio and Issa

with Generic Republican and Generic Democrat

Results

District 51

The 51st district runs along the border with Mexico and includes Imperial County and southern San Diego, including western Chula Vista, Imperial Beach, and National City. The incumbent is Democrat Juan Vargas, who was re-elected with 71.2% of the vote in 2018.

Candidates

Advanced to general
 Juan Hidalgo Jr. (Republican), U.S. Marine Corps veteran and candidate for California's 51st congressional district in 2016 & 2018
 Juan Vargas (Democratic), incumbent U.S. Representative

Endorsements

Predictions

Results

District 52

The 52nd district is based in San Diego County, including coastal and central portions of the city of San Diego in addition to Carmel Valley, La Jolla, Point Loma, downtown San Diego, and the suburbs of Poway and Coronado. The incumbent is Democrat Scott Peters, who was re-elected with 63.8% of the vote in 2018.

Candidates

Advanced to general
 Jim DeBello (Republican), former CEO of Mitek Systems
 Scott Peters (Democratic), incumbent U.S. Representative

Eliminated in primary
 Nancy L. Casady (Democratic), California Department of Food and Agriculture board-member
 Ryan Cunningham (no party preference), public finance banker

Predictions

Results

District 53

The 53rd district encompasses eastern San Diego and its eastern suburbs, including, eastern Chula Vista, western El Cajon, Bonita, La Mesa, Lemon Grove, and Spring Valley. The incumbent is Democrat Susan Davis, who was re-elected with 69.1% of the vote in 2018. On September 4, 2019, Davis announced she would not seek re-election.

Candidates

Advanced to general
 Georgette Gómez (Democratic), president of the San Diego City Council
 Sara Jacobs (Democratic), candidate for California's 49th congressional district in 2018, policy advisor for the Hillary Clinton 2016 presidential campaign, and granddaughter of Qualcomm founder Irwin Jacobs

Eliminated in primary
 John Brooks (Democratic), biologist
 Jose Caballero (Democratic), political consultant
 Joseph R. Fountain (Democratic), special education teacher
 Fernando Garcia (no party preference), businessman
 Janessa Goldbeck (Democratic), humans rights activist and U.S. Marines veteran
 Eric Roger Kutner (Democratic), policy advisor
 Annette Meza (Democratic), educator
 Michael Patrick Oristian (Republican), software developer
 Famela Ramos (Republican), nurse
 Suzette Santori (Democratic), ride-share driver
 Chris Stoddard (Republican), realtor
 Joaquín Vazquez (Democratic), community advocate
 Tom Wong (Democratic), political science professor at UC San Diego

Declined
 Toni Atkins (Democratic), president pro tempore of the California State Senate (endorsed Gomez)
 Susan Davis (Democratic), incumbent U.S. Representative
 Nathan Fletcher (Democratic), San Diego County supervisor and former state representative (endorsed Gomez)
 Todd Gloria (Democratic), state assemblyman (running for mayor of San Diego, endorsed Gomez)
 Lorena Gonzalez (Democratic), state assemblywoman (endorsed Gomez)
 Morgan Murtaugh (Republican), former OAN political commentator and candidate for California's 53rd congressional district in 2018 (endorsed Jacobs)

Endorsements

Predictions

Polling

Primary election

General election

Results

Notes
Party ballot access

Partisan clients

Additional candidates

References

External links

California
2020
House